The 2021 Coppa Bernocchi (also known as the Coppa Bernocchi – GP Banco BPM for sponsorship reasons) was the 102nd edition of the Coppa Bernocchi road cycling one day race, which was held in and around Legnano, Italy, on 4 October 2021. This edition was the race's first in the UCI ProSeries; the 2020 edition was expected to feature in the inaugural UCI ProSeries but was cancelled due to the COVID-19 pandemic. The race was the first of the 2021 Trittico Lombardo, which also included the Tre Valli Varesine held the day after and the Coppa Ugo Agostoni, to be held a week later.

The  race started from the Piazza San Magno in Legnano, with five sprint points in the first  at San Giorgio su Legnano, Nerviano, San Vittore Olona, Cerro Maggiore, and Busto Arsizio. The course then headed north to take on six laps of an approximately  circuit that featured ascents of San Pancrazio and the Piccolo Stelvio. Following this, the course returned to Legnano and finished with three laps of a  circuit around the town.

After previous breakaway attempts were reeled back in by the peloton, six riders attacked to form another breakaway just under  into the race. On the laps of the first circuit, the sextet gradually increased their advantage, which initially stabilised at just over four minutes by the  mark, but their advantage continued to increase as they entered the final . With  left, Remco Evenepoel attacked from the lead group. The advantage of the leading six riders was so great that, by the final lap, race organisers forced the peloton to stop and let the sextet pass. Evenepoel continued to increase his lead over the final kilometres and soloed to the victory. With  left, Alessandro Covi ( attacked from the remainder of the breakaway and was immediately chased by Evenepoel's teammate Fausto Masnada; they stayed ahead of the other three, with Covi outsprinting Masnada for second place just under two minutes in arrears. Samuele Battistella and Thibaut Pinot finished around 30 seconds later, while stagiaire Antonio Puppio, the last rider in the breakaway, finished a further thirty seconds later. Just under 11 minutes after Evenepoel had finished, Covi's teammate Juan Sebastián Molano won the sprint for seventh and led in the peloton.

Teams 
13 of the 19 UCI WorldTeams, eight UCI ProTeams, and four UCI Continental teams make up the 25 teams that participated in the race. In total, 170 riders started the race, of which 100 finished.

UCI WorldTeams

 
 
 
 
 
 
 
 
 
 
 
 
 

UCI ProTeams

 
 
 
 
 
 
 
 

UCI Continental Teams

Result

References

External links 
  

Coppa Bernocchi
Coppa Bernocchi
Coppa Bernocchi
Legnano